Charlotte Spurkeland (born 12 August 1987) is a Norwegian politician for the Conservative Party.

She served as a deputy representative to the Parliament of Norway from Hordaland during the term 2013–2017. In total she met during 150 days of parliamentary session. Hailing from Bergen, she has been a member of Bergen city council and worked her dayjob for the Conservative caucus in the council. She has chaired the Conservative Students in Norway and is a central board member of the Norwegian Young Conservatives. She has also been involved in student politics at the University of Bergen, where she has studied law. Internationally she is the current Chairman of the International Young Democrat Union and has been a co-chair for the permanent working group on Policies for Europe in the European Democrat Students.

References

1987 births
Living people
Deputy members of the Storting
Conservative Party (Norway) politicians
Politicians from Bergen
Women members of the Storting
21st-century Norwegian politicians